Adado Airport , also known as Cadaado Airport, is an airport serving the town of Adado in Adado District, Somalia.

Airlines and destinations

See also

 List of airports in Somalia
 Transport in Somalia

References

 Google Earth

External links
 HERE Maps - Adado
 OpenStreetMap - Adado

Airports in Somalia